Conclavism is the practice that has existed since the second half of the 20th century which consists in the convening of a conclave — a human institution — to elect rival popes ('antipopes') to the current pope of Rome. This method is used by some Catholics, often sedevacantists, who do not accept the legitimacy of their present papacy. Those who hold the position that a conclave can be convened to elect a pope to rival the current pope of Rome are called Conclavists.

This claim is usually associated with the claim, known as sedevacantism, that the present holder of the title of pope is not pope, which implies they consider they have the right to elect a pope. However, not all Sedevacantists are Conclavists.

Conclavism is different from what George Chryssides calls the "Mysticalists" phenomenon, i.e. people declaring themselves popes after receiving a personal mystical revelation. This is because in the Mysticalists' cases no human institution is used to have a pope appointed; an example of those cases is the Apostles of Infinite Love.

The term "Conclavism" comes from the word "conclave", the term for a meeting of the College of Cardinals convened to elect a bishop of Rome, when that see is vacant.

Description 

The description and explanation of Conclavism of Chryssides is:

History

The idea of "reconvening a conclave arose in the late 1960s and early 1970s". One of the first proponents of the idea is Joaquín Sáenz y Arriaga, a Mexican priest.

In the late 1980s, David Bawden promoted the idea of a papal election and ultimately sent out over 200 copies of a book of his to the editors of all the sedevacantist publications he could find, and to all the priests listed in a directory of traditionalists as being sedevacantists. He was then elected in 1990 by a group of six people who included himself and his parents, and took the name "Pope Michael".

Conclavist claimants to the papacy

 Pope Michael. David Allen Bawden. In 1990 six people, which included Bawden's parents, elected Bawden who took the name Pope Michael. He died on 2 August 2022.
 Pope Linus II. Another conclave, this time held in Assisi, Italy, elected the South African Victor von Pentz, an ex-seminarian of the Society of St Pius X, as Pope Linus II in 1994. Linus took up residence in Hertfordshire, England.
 Pope Pius XIII. In October 1998, the U.S.-based True Catholic Church elected Friar Lucian Pulvermacher as Pope Pius XIII. He died on 30 November 2009. No successor has been named since his death.
 Pope Leo XIV. On 24 March 2006 a group of 34 elected the Argentine Oscar Michaelli as Pope Leo XIV. On his death in 2007, Leo XIV was succeeded by Juan Bautista Bonetti, who took the name of Pope Innocent XIV, but resigned three months later. He was succeeded by Alejandro Tomas Cardinal Greico, who took the name of Pope Alexander IX.

See also

 Antipope
 Sedevacantism
 Sedeprivationism
 Episcopi vagantes
 Independent Catholic Churches
 Traditionalist Catholic
 Palmarian Christian Church

References

Conclavism